Abdul Ghani Ajeel al-Asadi(), is an Iraqi General and Force Commander of the Iraqi Special Operations Forces. al-Asadi was born in 1951 in Maysan Governorate, Iraq.

Wars in which he participated 
 Yom Kippur War
 Iran–Iraq War
 Gulf War
 Iraq War
 Operation Ashura
 Siege of Amirli
 Battle of Baiji (2014–15)
 Second Battle of Tikrit
 Battle of Ramadi (2015–16)
 Battle of Fallujah (2016)
 Battle of Mosul (2016–2017)

References

External links
 Official Website of Iraqi Special Operations Forces
 An interview with Abdul Ghani al-Asadi (YouTube)

Military leaders of the Gulf War
Living people
Iraqi Shia Muslims
Iraqi generals
1951 births
People of the War in Iraq (2013–2017)